SAIT/AUArts/Jubilee station, is a  CTrain light rail station in Calgary Calgary, Alberta. It serves the Northwest Line (Route 201) and opened on September 7, 1987, as part of the original line. The station is located on the exclusive LRT right of way in the heart of the Southern Alberta Institute of Technology (SAIT) campus, 1.8 km northwest of the 7 Avenue & 9 Street SW. 

The station possesses a center-loading platform which has grade-level access at the West end and +15 access at the East end connecting to both SAIT and the Alberta University of the Arts (AUArts). Stairs, an elevator and an escalator connect the platform to the +15.  The station's full name is Southern Alberta Institute of Technology/Alberta University of the Arts/Southern Alberta Jubilee Auditorium. The station serves all of the aforementioned landmarks, and is also located close to the northern periphery of Riley Park. 

When the station opened, the signage read "SAIT/ACA/Jubilee", as the station was constructed eight years before the Alberta College of Art changed its name to Alberta College of Art and Design. The signage was changed to "SAIT/AUArts/Jubilee" in mid-2019 due to the name change of Alberta College of Art and Design to the Alberta University of the Arts, although some trains continued to announce "SAIT/ACAD/Jubilee" until late 2019.

As part of Calgary Transit's plan to operate four-car trains by the end of 2014, all three-car platforms were to be extended. Construction of the extension for the then called SAIT/ACAD/Jubilee station started July 3, 2014 and was completed by the end of 2014.

References

CTrain stations
Railway stations in Canada at university and college campuses
Southern Alberta Institute of Technology
Railway stations in Canada opened in 1987
1987 establishments in Alberta